The Scotch Whisky Association (SWA) is a trade organisation that represents the Scotch whisky industry. The Scotch whisky industry is an important part of the Scottish economy, and particularly the Scottish export market.

Structure
The main office of the SWA is based in the Lauriston area of Edinburgh, Scotland (Quartermile Two, 2 Lister Square, Edinburgh EH3 9GL).

Membership
Members include (among others):
 Beam Suntory
 Chivas Brothers
 Diageo
 Drambuie Liqueur Company
 Highland Distillers
 John Dewar & Sons
 John Haig
 John Walker & Sons
 Scotch Malt Whisky Society
 The Edrington Group
 Tomatin distillery
 Whyte and Mackay
 William Grant & Sons
 William Teacher & Sons

Of these, Diageo and Chivas Brothers are the largest.

Purpose
The SWA's stated purpose is to promote, protect and represent the interests of the whisky industry in Scotland and around the world. Similar to the Portman Group, it also promotes responsible drinking, with campaigns to curb drinking to excess.

History
It was formed on 17 April 1942. It became a limited company in 1960. The SWA's members represent over 95% of Scotch whisky production, which encompasses over 2,500 brands around the world.

The SWA led an unsuccessful challenge to the Scottish government's minimum alcohol price policy, enshrined in the Alcohol (Minimum Pricing) (Scotland) Act 2012. The UK's Supreme Court ruled on 15 November 2017 that the Act was not disproportionate to the stated policy aim of reducing alcohol misuse and overconsumption, and therefore not contrary to EU law. Karen Betts, the SWA chief executive, said the association "accept[s] the Supreme Court's ruling".

Achievements
Scotch whisky has been a major industry for decades with exports totalling £4.7 billion in 2018, according to the Association. Whisky tourism is a side-benefit with distilleries being the third most visited attractions in Scotland, according to the Association of Leading Visitor Attractions. Some  2 million visits were recorded in 2018, a 6.1% increase over 2017 and a 56% increase compared to 2010. Some 68 distilleries operate visitor centres in Scotland and another eight accept visits by appointment. Hotels, restaurants and other facilities also benefit from the millions of pounds spent by tourists.

The tourism has been a real plus to the economy, and of significant value especially in remote, rural areas, according to Fiona Hyslop MSP, Cabinet Secretary for Culture, Tourism and External Affairs. "The Scottish Government is committed to working with partners like the Scotch Whisky Association to increase our tourism offer and encourage more people to visit our distilleries," the Secretary added.

See also
 List of whisky brands

References

External links

Video clips
 A tough year in May 2009
 Improving export business in September 2008
 Interview with Gavin Hewitt

News items
 981 million bottles exported in April 2004
 Industry protection in November 2009
 One billion bottles exported in April 2007
 Protecting the integrity of the industry in December 2007
 Safe drinking in November 2009

Organizations established in 1942
Scotch whisky
Industry trade groups based in Scotland
Organisations based in Edinburgh
1942 establishments in Scotland